Arabriga is a monotypic moth genus of the family Noctuidae. Its only species, Arabriga bimaculata, is known from Honduras. Both the genus and species were first described by Francis Walker in 1869.

References

Catocalinae
Monotypic moth genera